Pharez Whitted is an American jazz trumpeter and educator from Indianapolis.

Biography
Born in Indianapolis, Whitted grew up in a family of musicians that included his mother, Virtue Hampton Whitted, his aunt Dawn Hampton, and his uncle Slide Hampton. His father, Thomas, played drums with Freddie Hubbard and Wes Montgomery, both natives of Indianapolis. He studied music at DePauw University and earned a master's degree from the Jacobs School of Music at Indiana University in Bloomington.

He has worked with George Duke, Slide Hampton, Elvin Jones, Ramsey Lewis, Branford Marsalis, Wynton Marsalis, John Mellencamp, Roy Meriwether, The O'Jays, Lou Rawls, The Temptations, Kirk Whalum, and former The Tonight Show bassist Bob Hurst. Whitted wrote, produced, and arranged his first two albums for Motown. He co-produced the album People Make the World Go 'Round. His album Transient Journey was released in 2010 by the jazz label Owl Studios in Indianapolis.

He has toured in a band with Bobby Broom, Ron Perrillo, and Eddie Bayard. Whitted has performed throughout the United States and overseas, including shows at the 1988 Presidential Inauguration, The Arsenio Hall Show, The Billboard Music Awards, Carnegie Hall, and the MoTown Music Showcase. He has been jazz director of Chicago's Youth Symphony Orchestra and works with Jazz at Lincoln Center and Ravinia's Jazz Scholar program. He has been director of jazz studies at Chicago State University.

Awards and honors
In January 2011, Whitted was nominated for the 10th Annual Independent Music Awards in the Jazz Album category for Transient Journey. In December 2016 he was named one of six "Chicagoans of the Year" by the Chicago Tribune.

Discography

As leader
 1994 Pharez Whitted (Motown)
 1996 Mysterious Cargo (Motown)
 2010 Transient Journey (Owl)
 2012 For the People (Origin)
 2014 Tree of Life (Truth Revolution)

As guest
 1991 John Mellencamp, Whenever We Wanted
 1998 Jimmy Coe, Say What
 2007 Ari Brown, Live at the Green Mill
 2009 Kobie Watkins, Involved

References

External links
 Review of Transient Journey at AllAboutJazz.com

American jazz trumpeters
American male trumpeters
American jazz composers
American male jazz composers
DePauw University alumni
Jacobs School of Music alumni
Chicago State University faculty
1960 births
Living people
Owl Studios artists
21st-century trumpeters
21st-century American male musicians